The Georgia Land Conservation Program (GLCP) works to permanently protect land and water resources in the U.S. state of Georgia through public/private partnerships. Created in 2005 by former Governor Sonny Perdue through the Georgia Land Conservation Act, the GLCP provides grants, low-interest loans, and tax credits to achieve permanent land conservation through conservation easements and fee simple ownership.

Conservation objectives 
Managed by the Georgia Environmental Finance Authority, the GLCP has 10 conservation objectives:

Water quality protection
Flood prevention
Wetlands preservation
Erosion prevention
Wildlife habitat maintenance
Preserving agriculture
Enhancing historic sites
Maintaining scenic views
Recreation provision
Connecting natural and recreational areas

The Georgia Conservation Tax Credit Program 
The GLCP also administers the Georgia Conservation Tax Credit Program. The tax credit allows landowners who donate fee-title lands or permanent conservation easements to apply for a credit against their state income taxes. Approved donors may earn credits equal to 25 percent of the fair market value of their donations, up to $250,000 for individual donors, and $500,000 for corporate and partnership donors.

The Land Conservation Council 
The Land Conservation Council, which governs the GLCP, includes five state agency leaders and four gubernatorial appointments.

References 

Environment of Georgia (U.S. state)
Conservation projects in the United States
Land Conservation Program